Lady Elizabeth Southwell (née Cromwell), called Lady Cromwell (1674–1709) was an English noblewoman, the only daughter of Vere Essex Cromwell, 4th Earl of Ardglass and wife Catherine Hamilton.

Title
When her father died in 1687, she claimed his title of Baron Cromwell, although his Earldom and Viscountship became extinct; she was ranked with the Peeresses at the funeral of Queen Mary II and the coronation of Queen Anne, but her claim appears to have been a mistake.

Whether she was entitled to succeed her father depends on how the barony was created. A barony by writ descends to an only daughter, if  a baron have no sons; a barony by patent follows the rule of descent given in the patent - normally to the male heirs of the grantee, which would exclude daughters.

The Barony of Cromwell has a patent, granted in 1540 to Gregory Cromwell, 1st Baron Cromwell of Oakham (and his heirs male), son of Henry VIII's Minister Thomas Cromwell, after his father's fall and execution. But the antiquarian William Dugdale had claimed in the 1670s that there was also a writ summoning Gregory Cromwell as Baron Cromwell, dated 28 April 1539. Although he gives a text of the writ, the form is not standard, and no writs at all are recorded as being issued on that day - the first day of Parliament, and so rather late to summon men to attend it; the Complete Peerage conjectures that Dugdale saw a reference to Lord Cromwell in the proceedings of the Parliament, deduced that it meant the son - not the father - and supplied the writ he assumed must exist. Gregory Cromwell was, however, elected as one of the Knights of the Shire for Kent in 1539, and was summoned to Parliament that year to sit in the House of Commons.

Courtship, Marriage, and Issue
In 1703, Cromwell was courted by Anglo-Virginian planter William Byrd II. While she travelled to Dublin with Edward Southwell, the Secretary of State for Ireland, Byrd wrote a series of letters addressing Cromwell as 'Facetia' and himself as 'Veramour'. Byrd and Southwell were close friends at the time. Southwell's father, Sir Robert Southwell, had secured Byrd's entry into the Royal Society before dying in 1702. Cromwell's replies do not survive, but Byrd's outgoing letters (preserved and published by Marion Tinling) show how he grew irritated as she stopped replying to his persistent and melodramatic letters. Byrd grew angry, lashing out at Cromwell's 'hibernian amuzement' and 'laziness', sabotaging any hopes of a successful courtship.

On 29 October 1704, Cromwell married Edward Southwell in Ireland. Their son, Edward Southwell, did not style himself Baron Cromwell of Oakham. Cromwell's grandson inherited the much older and more distinguished Barony of Clifford as the title's 20th holder.

Death
Elizabeth died of consumption on 31 March 1709 and was buried at Henbury. In a letter to Lord Raby, on 1 April 1709,  Lady Wentworth wrote that "Your old Mrs. is dead and left thre lovly boys behynde and a dismall mallancolly husband ; its Lady Betty Southwell whoe made a very good wife, and he a fond husband."

References

Bibliography

External links 

 Cracroft's Peerage, Ardglass, Earl of (I, 1645 - 1687)
 

Year of birth unknown
1709 deaths
Year of birth uncertain
Elizabeth
Daughters of Irish earls
1674 births
17th-century English women
17th-century English people